Gary Parsons is the former chairman of the board for Sirius XM Radio.  Parsons was also formerly on the board of WorldSpace.

Parsons was with MCI Communications Corporation, where he served in a variety of roles from 1990 to 1996. He served as chairman of the board of directors for XM Satellite Radio from May 1997. He served as CEO until the recruitment of Hugh Panero. Parsons was chairman of the board of directors of Motient Corporation from March 1998 to May 2002. Parsons joined Motient in July 1996, and also served as its chief executive officer and president. He serves on the board of Sorrento Networks Corporation and is chairman and was previously chief executive officer of Mobile Satellite Ventures L.P. Parsons resigned from his position as chairman of the board for Sirius XM Radio in November 2009, and was succeeded by independent director Eddy Hartenstein. He has two sons, Gary "Mike" Michael Parsons Jr. and Kenneth James Parsons. He is currently the Executive Chairman of the Board at NextNav.

References
Parsons Resigns as Chairman of Sirius XM Radio

American corporate directors
Living people
XM Satellite Radio
Sirius XM
Clemson University alumni
Place of birth missing (living people)
Year of birth missing (living people)